Dr. Prabhakiran Jain (born 1963) is a poet and author.

Biography
She has a Ph.D. in Political Science and has worked extensively in creating awareness about contribution of Nominated Members of Rajya Sabha.

She has been featured on TV Channels including Doordarshan Network, NDTV, Star Plus, SAB TV, Sony Entertainment Television, India TV, Sudarshan TV, Sahara TV, Focus TV, Mahua TV, Total TV, as well as on Radio networks in various countries including India, Australia & New Zealand.

She represented Indian Council For Cultural Relations, Government of India in United Kingdom and has participated in literary events in the United States of America, Australia and South Africa etc.

Prabhakiran runs a non-profit organisation called Prem Shanti Sahitya Sanskriti Sansthan to promote literary releases. She is the joint secretary of the Akhil Bhartvarshiya Digamber Jain Parishad.

Publications

Children 

Poetry 
 Rang Birange Baloon (1995)
 Geet Khilone (2002)
 Chahak Bhi Jaroori Mehak Bhi Jaroori (2004) (With Dr. Sherjung Garg)
 Gobar Banam Gobardhan
 Ibanbatoota Ka Joota (2015)
 Chal Meri Dholaki (2015)

Story books 
 Anath Kisaan
 Jamalo Ka Chura
 Katha Sarita Katha Sagar (2007)

Biography 
 Samrat Ashok (2017)
 Chanakya (2017)
 Sarvepalli Radhakrishnan (2017)
 Mahatma Gandhi (2017)

Indology 
 Vaishali Ke Mahavir (2003; in Hindi & English) (Translated to English by Amarendra Khatua)
 Chaitanya (2017)
 Mahaveer (2017)
 Shri Ram (2017)
 Gommateshwar Bahubali (2018; in Hindi & English) (Translated to English by Sahu Akhilesh Jain)

Others 

Poetry 
 Nagfani Sadabahar Hai (1997)
 Dus Lakshan

Research work 
 Manonayan : Rajya Sabha ke Manoneet Sadasya (2013)

Editorial works 
 Vaishalik Ki Chhaya Mein (2005) (with Rajesh Jain)
 Veer (magazine) (1989-2017)

Awards and honours 
She is a recipient of various literary awards. Most notably she is the recipient of multiple awards by Hindi Academy, Govt. of N.C.T. of  Delhi:
 Pandulipi Samman (for Geet Khilone) (2002)
 Bal Evam Kishore Sahitya Samman (for Katha Sarita Katha Sagar) (2007)
 Hindi Academy Bal Sahitya Samman (2016)

External links 

 Official Website of ICCR
 Happenings in New Delhi
 Official Website of The High Commission of India in London
 List of Published Hindi Books for Children
 Official Website of Akhil Bharatvarshiya Digambar Jain Parishad

1963 births
Living people
20th-century Indian women writers
20th-century Indian poets
20th-century Indian Jain writers
Indian women children's writers
Indian children's writers
Indian women poets
Hindi-language poets